Aytekin Viduşlu (born 28 August 1978) is a Turkish professional football coach and a former player. He played captain of the team against Belediye Vanspor match after Yunus İçuz's missing.

External links
 Profile at TFF.org

References

1978 births
Living people
Sportspeople from Manisa
Turkish footballers
Association football central defenders
Turkey youth international footballers
[[Category:Süper Lig players]MKE Ankaragücü footballers
Dardanelspor footballers
İstanbulspor footballers
Antalyaspor footballers
Orduspor footballers
Balıkesirspor footballers
Turkish football managers